The United States Air Force's 66th Weapons Squadron is a United States Air Force Weapons School Fairchild Republic A-10 Thunderbolt II instructional flying unit, at Nellis Air Force Base, Nevada.

The squadron was first activated in the build up of the American military prior to its entry into World War II as the 66th Pursuit Squadron.  After training in the United States, it deployed to North Africa in 1942, and participated in combat in the Mediterranean Theater of Operations.  The squadron moved forward through Egypt, Libya, and Tunisia with Allied forces, moving to Italy in 1943.  The 66th earned three Distinguished Unit Citations for its combat actions before returning to the United States for inactivation in 1945.

The following year, the squadron was activated for the air defense of Alaska.  It served in this role, and briefly in the air defense of California, before inactivating in 1958.  It was reactivated in 1969 as the 66th Fighter Weapons Squadron, an advanced training unit for Wild Weasel tactics until inactivating in 1981.

Overview
Active since 2003, the 66th Weapons Squadron teaches graduate-level instructor courses that provide training in weapons and tactics employment to officers of the combat air forces and mobility air forces.  The 66th focuses on the A-10 Thunderbolt II, with the climax of the course being the mission employment phase, a two-week staged battle over the Nevada Test and Training Range.

Upon graduation, the new weapons officers return to the field to serve as unit weapons and tactics officers, providing advanced instruction and technical advice to their commanders, operations officers, and personnel.

History

World War II

Formed as a P-40 Warhawk pursuit squadron in January 1941 as part of the Army Air Corps Northeast Defense Sector (later I Fighter Command) at Mitchel Field, New York.   Trained in New England and provided air defense of the northeast after the Japanese attack on Pearl Harbor.

Was reassigned to the U.S. Army Middle East Force in Egypt, July 1942, becoming part of IX Fighter Command.  Took part in the British Western Desert campaign, engaged in combat during the Battle of El Alamein and, as part of Ninth Air Force, supported the Commonwealth Eighth Army's drive across Egypt and Libya, escorting bombers and flying strafing and dive-bombing missions against airfields, communications, and troop concentrations until Axis defeat in Tunisia in May 1943. The unit participated in the reduction of Pantelleria (May–June 1943) and the conquest of Sicily (July–August 1943).

The squadron supported the British Eighth Army's landing at Termoli and subsequent operations in Italy, being reassigned to Twelfth Air Force in August 1943.   It flew dive-bombing, strafing, patrol, and escort missions.

In 1944, converted to P-47 Thunderbolt aircraft and flew interdiction operations in Italy. They moved to Corsica on 30 March 1944 to operate as a separate task force. It flew interdiction missions against railroads, communication targets, and motor vehicles behind enemy lines, providing a minimum of 48 fighter-bomber sorties per day.

Participated in the French campaign against Elba in June 1944 and in the invasion of Southern France in August. It engaged in interdiction and support operations in northern Italy from September 1944 to May 1945.

The 66th flew its last combat mission on 2 May 1945. Remained in northern Italy after the end of the European War, demobilizing throughout the summer of 1945.  It was reassigned to the United States in August 1945 without personnel or equipment and was inactivated at the end of August.

Cold War

Reactivated in August 1946 as part of Eleventh Air Force (Later Alaskan Air Command) as part of the air defense forces in the northwest Pacific. Squadron began training new P-51 pilots at Elmendorf Field, Alaska. Later, it was equipped with F-80Bs in March–April 1948, F-80Cs in October–December 1948, F-94Bs in the summer of 1951, and F-89Cs in September 1953. With these aircraft, the squadron provided fighter aircraft defense in support of the Alaska Area until late in the 1950s.

Was reassigned to Oxnard AFB, California in 1957, but was never equipped or manned due to budgetary constraints, inactivated by Air Defense command, January 1958.

Reactivated by Tactical Air Command at Nellis AFB, Nevada in October 1969 Assumed the F-105C/D Thunderchief assets of the provisional 4537th Fighter Weapons Squadron, tail coded "WC".  Mission was to perform "Wild Weasel" training for USAF pilots and electronic warfare officers to be deployed to combat missions in Southeast Asia.  Squadron aircraft carried tail code "WA" by October 1971, black/yellow checkered tail stripes.  Squadron also assumed F-4C Phantom II assets, tail coded "WD" until October 1971, then changed to same "WA" as the F-105s.  Trained with the F-4s and F-105s until July 1975 when Wild Weasel training and aircraft reassigned to George AFB, California.

Remained in non-operational status until October 1977 when reorganized as an A-10 Squadron, tail coded "WA", black/yellow checkered tail stripes.  Performed fighter weapons training with the A-10 until the end of 1981, when inactivated and squadron was reassigned to the USAF Fighter Weapons School, being re-designated as "A-10 Division".

Modern era
Reactivated in February 2003 as 66th Weapons Squadron (66 WPS), replacing USAF Weapons School A-10 division.  Provides USAF Weapons School syllabus support, priority test mission support and road shows that visit various units throughout the CONUS to ACC units for training.

Lineage
 Constituted as the 66th Pursuit Squadron (Interceptor) on 20 November 1940
 Activated on 15 January 1941
 Redesignated 66th Pursuit Squadron (Interceptor) (Twin Engine) on 31 January 1942
 Redesignated 66th Fighter Squadron (Twin Engine) on 15 May 1942
 Redesignated 66th Fighter Squadron on 1 June 1942
 Redesignated 66th Fighter Squadron, Single Engine' on 21 August 1944
 Inactivated on 7 November 1945
 Activated on 15 August 1946
 Redesignated 66th Fighter Squadron, Jet on 20 July 1948
 Redesignated 66th Fighter-Interceptor Squadron on 20 January 1950
 Inactivated on 8 January 1958
 Redesignated 66th Fighter Weapons Squadron on 22 August 1969
 Activated on 15 October 1969
 Inactivated on 30 Dec 1981
 Redesignated 66th Weapons Squadron on 24 January 2003
 Activated and organized on 3 February 2003

Assignments
 57th Pursuit Group (later 57th Fighter Group), 15 January 1941 – 7 November 1945
 57th Fighter Group (later 57th Fighter-Interceptor Group), 15 August 1946
 10th Air Division, 13 April 1953
 414th Fighter Group, 1 December 1957 – 8 January 1958
 57th Fighter Weapons Wing (later 57th Tactical Training Wing, 57th Fighter Weapons Wing), 15 October 1969 – 30 December 1981
 USAF Weapons School, 3 February 2003 – present

Stations

 Mitchel Field, New York, 15 January 1941
 Bradley Field, Connecticut, 18 August 1941
 Farmingdale Army Air Field, New York, 14 December 1941
 Quonset Point Naval Air Station, Rhode Island, 27 February 1942
 Hillsgrove Army Air Field, Rhode Island, 8 June – 5 July 1942
 RAF Beit Daras , Palestine, 19 August 1942
 Egypt, 16 September 1942
 RAF Gambut, Libya, 13 November 1942
 El Gazala Airfield, Libya, 15 November 1942
 Belandah Airfield, Libya, 11 December 1942
 Hamraiet Airfield, Libya, 12 January 1943
 Darragh Airfield, Libya, 18 January 1943
 Zuara Airfield, Libya, 24 February 1943
 Nefatia Airfield, Tunisia, 5 March 1943
 Ben Gardane Airfield, Tunisia, 7 March 1943
 Soltane Airfield, Tunisia, 20 March 1943
 Medenine Airfield, Tunisia, 4 April 1943
 Chekira Airfield, Tunisia, 11 April 1943
 El Djem Airfield, Tunisia, 14 April 1943
 El Hani Airfield, Tunisia, 21 April 1943

 Bou Grara Airfield, Tunisia, 20 May 1943
 Takali Airfield, Malta, 27 June 1943
 Pachino Airfield, Sicily, Italy, 19 July 1943
 Scordia Airfield, Sicily, Italy, 30 July 1943
 Gioia del Colle, Italy, c. 25 September 1943
 Foggia Airfield, Italy, c. 1 October 1943
 Amendola Airfield, Italy, 27 October 1943
 Cercola Airfield, Italy, c. 1 March 1944
 Alto Airfield, Corsica, 28 March 1944
 Ombrone Airfield, Italy, 11 September 1944
 Grosseto Airfield, Italy, 25 September 1944
 Villafranca di Verona Airfield, Italy, 29 April 1945
 Grosseto Airfield, Italy, 8 May 1945
 Bagnoli Airfield, Italy, 15 July – 5 August 1945
 Drew Field, Florida, 23 August – 7 November 1945
 Shemya Army Air Field, Aleutian Islands, 15 August 1946
 Elmendorf Field (later Elmendorf Air Force Base), Alaska, c. 30 May 1947 – 1 December 1957
 Oxnard Air Force Base, California, 1 December 1957 – 8 January 1958
 Nellis Air Force Base, Nevada, 15 October 1969 – 30 December 1981
 Nellis Air Force Base, Nevada, 3 February 2003 – present

Aircraft

 Curtiss P-40 Warhawk, 1941–1944
 Republic P-47 Thunderbolt, 1944–1945
 Lockheed P-38 Lightning, 1946
 North American P-51 Mustang, 1946–1948
 Lockheed F-80 Shooting Star, 1948–1951

 Lockheed F-94 Starfire, 1951–1953
 Northrop F-89 Scorpion, 1953–1957
 Republic F-105 Thunderchief, 1969–1975
 McDonnell F-4 Phantom II, c. 1971-1975
 Fairchild A-10 Thunderbolt II, 1977–1981, 2003 – present

References

Notes

Bibliography

 Further reading
 
 
 
 
 

Military units and formations in Nevada
Weapons 0066